Zdena may refer to:

 Zdena, river in Sanski Most
 Zdena Herfortová (born 1945), Czech film and stage actress
 Zdena Salivarová (born 1938), Czech-born writer and translator
 Zdena Studenková (born 1954), Slovak film and stage actress
 Zdena Tichá (born 1952), Czech rower
 Zdena Tomin (born 1941), Czech novelist and former communist-era dissident
 Zdena Zimmermannová (born 1973), Czech volleyball player

Czech feminine given names